Ann-Katrin Berger (born 9 October 1990) is a German professional footballer who plays as a goalkeeper for English club Chelsea and the Germany national team.

Early life
At the age of four, Berger began playing football in the KSG Eislingen. As a teenager, she moved to FV Faurndau. She played as a striker, midfielder and defender and only switched to the goal at the age of 16, because she became "lazy to run," and "has grown" again.

Club career
In 2007, she moved up to the Oberliga Baden-Württemberg. A year later, Berger moved to second division side, VfL Sindelfingen. In the summer of 2011, Berger signed a three-year contract with 1. FFC Turbine Potsdam in the Frauen-Bundesliga, the top division in Germany. She made her debut for the club on 21 August 2011 and shut out Hamburger SV 4–0. She made five appearances for the club during the 2011/2012 season playing a total of 450 minutes. Potsdam finished first in the league with an 18–2–2 record. She was the starting goalkeeper in three of Potsdam's 2011–12 UEFA Women's Champions League matches helping the squad earn shut-outs against Þór Akureyri and Glasgow City F.C.

Berger signed with Paris Saint-Germain in June 2014, playing 22 matches in all competitions during her two-year spell with the club. In June 2016, she joined Birmingham City.

In November 2017, Berger was diagnosed with thyroid cancer. She made a full recovery. During her battle with cancer, she had a desire to continue playing football. On 4 February 2018, she made her first appearance since being diagnosed with cancer in the Fourth Round of the 2017–18 FA Women's Cup in an away match against Reading. Birmingham won 1–0. With her strong determination she had a brilliant season, and as a result she won the PFA Team of the Year Award.

Berger continued her strong return in 2018, helping Birmingham City to a fourth-place standing after midway point of the 2018–19 FA WSL season. Having run down her contract at Birmingham City and rejected a new offer, she joined reigning champions Chelsea on 4 January 2019. Chelsea manager Emma Hayes signed her as part of the team rebuild even though Chelsea had 3 other goalkeepers on their roster.

In April 2021, Berger made title winning saves away against Manchester City in a 2–2 draw, as Chelsea fought to preserve their lead at the top of the table. Chelsea and manager Emma Hayes later won their 4th WSL title, the most by any WSL team, by 2 points on the final day of the 2020–21 season with a 5–0 victory over Reading. Chelsea broke the records for most wins (18) and most points (57) in a season, and became just the third team to defend the League title after Liverpool and Arsenal. Berger registered the most clean sheets (12), winning the Golden Glove. On 23 August 2022 Berger announced, that she is suffering from thyroid cancer again. A little over a month later, on the 25 September, Berger made her comeback against Manchester City.

International career
Berger received her first call-up to the Germany national team in November 2018.

Personal life 
Berger is openly gay, and in a relationship with her Chelsea teammate Jess Carter.

Youth Football 
Berger is an Ambassador and co-founder of the Judan Ali Football Academy known as JAFA based in London and founded in 2019.

Career statistics

Club

International

Honours
1. FFC Turbine Potsdam
 Bundesliga: 2011–12

Birmingham City
Women's FA Cup: runner-up: 2016–17

Chelsea
 FA Women's Super League: 2019–20, 2020–21, 2021–22
 FA Women's League Cup: 2019–20, 2020–21
 Women's FA Community Shield: 2020
 Women's FA Cup: 2020–21 2021–22
Germany

 UEFA Women's Championship runner-up: 2022
Individual

 FA WSL PFA Team of the Year: 2017–18,  2019–20,  2020–21, 2021–22

References

External links

 FFC Turbine Potsdam player profile
 PSG player profile
 

Living people
1990 births
Women's association football goalkeepers
1. FFC Turbine Potsdam players
Paris Saint-Germain Féminine players
German expatriate sportspeople in France
Expatriate women's footballers in France
German women's footballers
German expatriate women's footballers
Expatriate women's footballers in England
German expatriate sportspeople in England
Women's Super League players
Birmingham City W.F.C. players
Division 1 Féminine players
Chelsea F.C. Women players
Frauen-Bundesliga players
German LGBT footballers
German LGBT sportspeople
Lesbian sportswomen
Germany women's international footballers
Association football goalkeepers
21st-century German LGBT people
People from Göppingen
Sportspeople from Stuttgart (region)
Footballers from Baden-Württemberg
UEFA Women's Euro 2022 players